The Cost of recycling computers might refer to:

Computer recycling
Electronic waste